Artis P. Graves (September 23, 1907 – August 11, 1977) was an American football coach and educator.  He served as head football coach at Morris Brown College in Atlanta, Georgia, in 1940 and again from 1944 to 1949. His 1940 Morris Brown Wolverines football team compiled a record of 10–1, winning the Southern Intercollegiate Athletic Conference (SIAC) title and a black college football national championship.

Graves played college football at Bluefield State College in Bluefield, West Virginia, where was a three-time Negro All-American.  He later earned a PhD from the University of Iowa.  Graves also coached athletics at Morristown College in Morristown, Tennessee and Shorter College in North Little Rock, Arkansas.

In 1950, Graves accepted the position of as chairman of the department of biology at North Carolina A&T State University in Greensboro, North Carolina.  He served in that role until his retirement June 1977.  Graves worked as a football and basketball official for the Central Intercollegiate Athletic Association for 25 years.

Graves died on August 11, 1977, at a hospital in Greensboro, following a short illness.

Head coaching record

References

1907 births
1977 deaths
20th-century American educators
African-American academics
College football officials
Basketball referees in the United States
Bluefield State Big Blues football players
Morris Brown Wolverines football coaches
North Carolina A&T State University faculty
University of Iowa alumni
African-American coaches of American football
African-American players of American football
20th-century African-American sportspeople